Lake Erastvere is a lake of Estonia.

See also
List of lakes of Estonia

Erastvere
Kanepi Parish
Erastvere